Cephisodotus, son of Praxiteles, brother of Timarchos and grandson of Cephisodotus the Elder.  None of his work remains in originals, but in later, mostly Roman copies. He was in a team with his brother a prolific sculptor of the latter part of the 4th century BC, especially noted for portraits, of Menander (ca. 80 remaining ancient replices), of the orator Lycurgus, and others.

Further reading 
 Klaus Fittschen: Zur Rekonstruktion griechischer Dichterstatuen. 1. Teil: Die Statue des Menander, In: Athener Mitteilungen 106 (1991), S. 243–279
 Bernard Andreae: Kephisodotos (II), In: Rainer Vollkommer: Künstlerlexikon der Antike, Nikol, Hamburg 2007, S. 410–411

References

4th-century BC Greek sculptors
Ancient Greek sculptors
Ancient Athenian sculptors